Walter Blair (April 21, 1900 – June 29, 1992) was a professor in the University of Chicago English department who was known for his study of American folklore, humor and tall tales.

Born in Spokane, Washington, he graduated from Yale University undergrad in 1923 and got his Ph.D. in English from U of C in 1931. He taught at Chicago from 1929 to 1968, and served as the chairman of his department for nine of those years (1951-1960).

Works included Native American Humor: 1800 to 1900 (1937), Horse Sense in American Humor (1942), Tall Tale America: A Legendary History of Our Humorous Heroes (1944, multiple reprints), Half-Horse Half-Alligator: The Growth of the Mike Fink Legend, Davy Crockett: Truth and Legend, Mark Twain & Huck Finn (1960), and a mystery novel called Candidate for Murder, the last of which was published under the pseudonym Mortimer Post.

Notable students of Blair included Nobel laureate Saul Bellow and Pulitzer Prize winner Philip Roth, as well as four other Pulitzer Prize winners.

In May 1992, he won the Distinguished Scholar Award of the Mark Twain Circle, an association of Twain scholars.

Blair was a resident of the Hyde Park neighborhood of Chicago.

References

External links
 ChiTrib obit: Walter Blair
 NYTimes obit: Walter Blair

University of Chicago faculty
1992 deaths
American folklorists
1900 births